Engineering is the most sought after subject areas among Sri Lankan students. The engineering degrees make up less than 2% of the bachelor's degrees in Sri Lanka.

Registration
The title of "engineer" is not regulated in Sri Lanka. However, as per the Engineering Council Act No 4 of 2017, all engineering practitioners in Sri Lanka needs to be registered with the engineering council to practice. Failing to do so would result in an offence and can be convicted by a summary trial before a Magistrate with imprisonment period not exceeding one year and/or a fine not exceeding one hundred thousand.

Categories of registered engineers
Registering engineering practitioners under the categories of;
Chartered Engineer (CEng) - Chartered Engineer of the Institution of Engineers, Sri Lanka (IESL)
Associate Engineer (AEng) - Four year Full-time degree in Engineering recognized by IESL or an Associate Member of IESL
Affiliate Engineer (AflEng) - Three year full-time degree in Engineering recognized by IESL
Incorporated Engineer (IEng) - Incorporated Engineer of the Institution of Incorporated Engineers, Sri Lanka (IIESL)
Engineering Diplomate (EngDip) - Diploma in Engineering from a recognized University or Technical or Technological Institute recognized by IIESL
Engineering Technician (EngTec) - National Vocational Qualification Level IV of Engineering Technology or equivalent qualification recognized by the Tertiary and Vocational Education Commission or one year full-time academic course in Engineering Technology and has gained one year industrial experience in the relevant field or a holder of a Diploma or Certificate in Technology by a University or a Technical or Technological Institute of the Government of Sri Lanka

Engineering Degrees

Public Universities 
Faculty of Engineering, University of Peradeniya
Faculty of Engineering, University of Moratuwa
Faculty of Engineering Technology, Open University of Sri Lanka
Faculty of Engineering, University of Ruhuna
Faculty of Engineering, General Sir John Kotelawala Defence University 
Faculty of Engineering, University of Jaffna
Faculty of Engineering Technology, University of Vocational Technology
Faculty of Engineering, South Eastern University of Sri Lanka
Faculty of Engineering, University of Sri Jayewardenepura

Autonomous Institutes 
Faculty of Engineering, Colombo International Nautical and Engineering College
School of Engineering, Sri Lanka Technological Campus
Faculty of Engineering, Sri Lanka Institute of Information Technology

Engineering Diplomas
 Institute of Engineering Technology, National Diploma in Engineering Sciences
 Technical Colleges in Sri Lanka
 Maradana College of Technology
 Technical College Balapitiya
 Institute of Technology, University of Moratuwa
 Ceylon-German Technical Training Institute
 Institute of Higher National Diploma in Engineering
 Sri Lanka Institute of Advanced Technological Education
 Hardy Advanced Technological Institute

See also
Engineering education
Education in Sri Lanka
Post-secondary qualifications in Sri Lanka

References

External links 
 https://www.iet.edu.lk/